Roots International Schools & Colleges (abbreviated as RISC) is an independent for-profit Pakistani educational institute which is part of Roots School System founded in 1988 by Mrs. Riffat Mushtaq. Roots International schools is established by her son Walid Mushtaq, and is operating 35 campuses in 19 cities of Pakistan.

Its primary school is based on curriculum derived from the UK's National Curriculum and IB Primary Years Programme, while its secondary school education is divided between the local Pakistani curriculum and the Cambridge regulated international GCE O/A levels programs, and IB programs. 
The school also offers Chinese, and German as being a member of Goethe-Institut Pasch schools network. It is a Microsoft mentor status school.

References

External links 
Roots International Schools official website

School systems in Pakistan
1988 establishments in Pakistan
Educational institutions established in 1988